Anders Krogsgaard (born 19 April 1996) is a Danish ice hockey player for HC TWK Innsbruck in the ICE Hockey League (ICEHL) and the Danish national team.

He represented Denmark at the 2021 IIHF World Championship.

References

External links

1996 births
Living people
Aalborg Pirates players
Danish expatriate ice hockey people
Danish expatriate sportspeople in Germany
Danish ice hockey defencemen
Esbjerg Energy players
Expatriate ice hockey players in Germany
Fischtown Pinguins players
People from Esbjerg
Sportspeople from the Region of Southern Denmark
HC TWK Innsbruck players
Danish expatriate sportspeople in Austria
Expatriate ice hockey players in Austria